The 1946–47 British Home Championship was a football tournament played between the British Home Nations during the 1946–47 seasons, the first professional football seasons in Britain since the end of the Second World War. As seven seasons had passed without regular, organised, professional football, many of the players in the tournament were new to the international stage although a few old hands remained to steer the course of the competition. England were especially well endowed in this regard, with such greats as Stanley Matthews and Tommy Lawton returning to the fray.

Thanks to the efforts of these aging stars, England were able to win this first post-war competition, largely due to an opening 7–2 thrashing of Ireland. Wales were able to achieve a 3–1 victory over Scotland in their opener to move into second position. In the second round of matches, Ireland improved sufficiently to hold Scotland to a scoreless draw whilst England set up a commanding lead with a 3–0 defeat of Wales at home. In the final games, Ireland defeated Wales in a close match to take second place whilst England were held to a 1–1 draw by the Scots but nevertheless succeeded in claiming the trophy for themselves.

Table

Results

References

1946 in British sport
1946–47 in Welsh football
1947 in British sport
1946–47 in English football
1946–47 in Scottish football
1946-47
1946–47 in Northern Ireland association football